The UPI College Basketball Coach of the Year was an annual basketball award given to the best men's basketball head coach in NCAA Division I competition. The award was first given following the 1954–55 season and was discontinued following the 1995–96 season. It was given by United Press International (UPI), a news agency in the United States that rivaled the Associated Press but began to decline with the advent of television news.
The last winner was Gene Keady of Purdue, who led the Boilermakers to a 26–6 record and a berth into the 1996 NCAA tournament's second round.

UCLA claimed the most all-time winners with six (all of whom were John Wooden), followed by San Francisco with three. Five additional schools claimed two winners apiece, while the rest only had one winner each.

Wooden garnered the most UPI Coach of the Year awards, receiving six throughout his tenure at UCLA. Six other coaches received the award twice: Bob Knight, Ray Meyer, Adolph Rupp, Norm Stewart, Fred Taylor and Phil Woolpert. The only coach whose team did not qualify for the NCAA Division I men's basketball tournament was Miami (FL)'s Leonard Hamilton, who won the award in 1994–95 after leading the Hurricanes to the first round of the National Invitation Tournament (NIT). Hamilton is also the only recipient with a double-digit loss season; his 1994–95 squad finished 15–13.

Key

Winners

References

Awards established in 1955
Awards disestablished in 1996
College basketball coach of the year awards in the United States
1955 establishments in the United States